Demyanovo is a rural locality (a village) in Yudinskoye Rural Settlement, Velikoustyugsky District, Vologda Oblast, Russia. The population was 36 as of 2002. There are 4 streets.

Geography 
Demyanovo is located 12 km northeast of Veliky Ustyug (the district's administrative centre) by road. Zapan Bobrovnikovo is the nearest rural locality.

References 

Rural localities in Velikoustyugsky District